Dream (styled DREAM in capitals) was a Japanese mixed martial arts (MMA) organization promoted by former PRIDE FC executives and K-1 promoter Fighting and Entertainment Group. Dream replaced FEG's previous-run mixed martial arts fight series, Hero's. The series retained many of the stylistic flourishes and personnel from Pride FC broadcasts, including fight introducer Lenne Hardt. In America, the promotion was aired on HDNet. They promoted over 20 shows highlighting some of the best Japanese and international MMA talent, establishing or enhancing the careers of top ranked fighters such as Shinya Aoki, Gesias Cavalcante, Tatsuya Kawajiri, Ronaldo Jacaré, Eddie Alvarez, Jason Miller, Kazushi Sakuraba, Gegard Mousasi and Alistair Overeem.

History

Pride FC's buyout and Yarennoka!
After the Zuffa buyout of Pride FC, the former Dream Stage Entertainment executives put on a collaborative New Year's Eve mixed martial arts show with Shooto, M-1 Global, and the Fighting and Entertainment Group, called Yarennoka!. This show was intended to be a farewell show of Pride FC. However, due to its success and further petitioning by Japanese MMA fans, the FEG and the former DSE staff decided to combine their efforts and form a new Japanese  promotion.

Hero's dissolution and Dream's emergence
Their new promotion was confirmed on February 13, 2008, along with Hero's dissolution. All of Hero's' fighters were confirmed (such as Hero's champions Norifumi "Kid" Yamamoto, Yoshihiro Akiyama and JZ Calvan) to be part of the new promotion along with the additions of Mirko "Cro Cop" Filipović, Shinya Aoki, Kazushi Sakuraba, Mitsuhiro Ishida, and Hayato "Mach" Sakurai. Another notable announcement was Dream's partnership with M-1 Global, who confirmed that they would allow the last Heavyweight Champion of Pride FC (and the winner of the 2004 Heavyweight Grand Prix), Fedor Emelianenko, to fight in their events. Emelianenko was present at the Dream press conference to promote the alliance between the two shows.

Partnership with HDNet
On May 2, 2008, Dream aired for the first time in the United States with a repeat of Dream 1 on HDNet. A repeat of Dream 2 was aired the following day, while Dream 3 was aired live on May 11. All future Dream events will be airing on HDNet as a part of the network's HDNet Fights series.

Partnership with EliteXC
On May 10, 2008, Dream announced the working partnership with US promotion EliteXC. The two groups intended to share fighters and eventually co-promote shows. However, with EliteXC went bankrupt before the alliance could materialize.

Alliance with Strikeforce
On August 5, 2009, Strikeforce CEO Scott Coker announced that the two promotions had signed a formal alliance. This is reportedly a deal that has been talked about for quite some time, but has finally come to fruition. The result of this deal is that the two organizations will exchange fighters and work together to bring MMA fans the best fights possible. Also, because of Strikeforce's recent agreement with Fedor Emelianenko and M-1 Global, it is presumable that they would be involved in the alliance as well. In October 2009, Strikeforce CEO Scott Coker stated interest in unifying the titles between the two promotions. However Dream never gave a public response. It's likely all unification plans were dropped due to Zuffa, the parent company of UFC, acquiring Strikeforce.

Alliance with ONE Fighting Championship
November 23, 2011 sources close to ONE Fighting Championship announced a new alliance with Dream to copromote shows and participate in fighter exchange.

Partnership with ProElite
On January 17, 2012 ProElite announced a partnership with Dream to copromote shows and exchange fighters.

Cease of business operations
On May 16, 2012, Sadaharu Tanikawa officially declared the bankruptcy of FEG. The promotion began to be managed by its proper parental company Real Entertainment Co. Ltd. and as of June 3, 2012, Dream has effectively gone out of business.

Revival show
A revival show dubbed "Dream.18: Special NYE 2012" was set for December 31, 2012 under the financial backing of kickboxing promotion Glory Sports International. The event promoted mixed martial arts and kickboxing bouts at Saitama Super Arena in Saitama, Japan, carrying on the tradition of fight events every New Year's Eve for at least one more year.

Rules

Weight classes
Dream had 7 weight classes. Unlike Hero's, each weight class had a champion with a defendable title.
 Bantamweight – 
 Featherweight – 
 Lightweight –  
 Welterweight – 
 Middleweight –  
 Light Heavyweight –  
 Heavyweight – no upper limit

Round length
 There were three 5-minute rounds.

Judging
 Fights were to be judged in their entirety by three judges, not on a round-by-round ten-point-must basis (more common to North American promotions).
 A winner was always to be declared, as draws were not possible.

Attire
Dream allowed fighters latitude in their choice of attire, but open finger gloves, a mouthguard and a protective cup were mandatory. Fighters were allowed to use tape on parts of their body or to wear a gi top, gi pants, wrestling shoes, kneepads, elbow pads, or ankle supports at their own discretion, though each had to be checked by the referee before the fight.

Fouls and violations
 Stomps and soccer kicks to the head of a grounded opponent were not allowed (unless both fighters were on the ground), but they were allowed to the rest of the body.
 Elbows to the head were prohibited.
 A grounded opponent was defined as one in a three-point position. If a fighter had, for example, both knees and one hand on the floor facing the mat, then no kicks to the head were allowed.
 Strikes to the back of the head were not allowed.

Tournament substitutions
 In case of a "no contest" or injury, the fighter able to continue would go through to the next round; if neither fighter was able to continue, the promoter would choose a replacement fighter to go through.

Final champions

Tournament finalists

Notable fighters

Bantamweight
 Antonio Banuelos
 Yoshiro Maeda
 Hideo Tokoro
 Kenji Osawa
 Masakazu Imanari
 Keisuke Fujiwara
 Atsushi Yamamoto
 Bibiano Fernandes (Dream Bantamweight Champion)
 Rodolfo Marques

Featherweight
 Joachim Hansen
 Tatsuya Kawajiri
 Hiroyuki Takaya (Dream Featherweight Champion)
 Daiki Hata
 Mitsuhiro Ishida
 Akiyo Nishiura
 Takeshi Inoue
 Kazuhisa Watanabe
 Kazuyuki Miyata
 Caol Uno

Lightweight
 Rich Clementi
 Shane Nelson
 Drew Fickett
 Rob McCullough
 Andre Amade
 Willamy Freire
 Gesias Calvancante
 Vítor Ribeiro
 Marcus Aurélio
 Shinya Aoki (Dream Lightweight Champion)
 Daisuke Nakamura
 Koutetsu Boku
 Tatsuya Kawajiri
 Katsunori Kikuno
 Katsuhiko Nagata
 Satoru Kitaoka

Welterweight
 Marius Zaromskis (Dream Welterweight Champion)
 Jason High
 Tarec Saffiedine
 Andrews Nakahara
 Jung Bu-Kyung
 Andy Ologun
 Yan Cabral
 Kazushi Sakuraba
 Kuniyoshi Hironaka
 Ryo Chonan
 Hayato Sakurai
 Yuya Shirai

Middleweight
 Karl Amoussou
 Zelg Galesic
 Gerald Harris
 Dong Sik Yoon
 Shungo Oyama
 Taiei Kin
 Kiyoshi Tamura
 Kazuhiro Nakamura

Light Heavyweight
 Gegard Mousasi (Dream Light Heavyweight Champion)
 Melvin Manhoef
 Ralek Gracie
 Rameau Thierry Sokoudjou
 Tatsuya Mizuno
 Hiroshi Izumi
 Trevor Prangley

Heavyweight
 Mark Hunt
 Jérôme Le Banner
 Fedor Emelianenko
 Bob Sapp
 Todd Duffee
 Jeff Monson
 Siala-Mou "Mighty Mo" Siliga
 James Thompson
 Hong Man Choi
 Katsuyori Shibata
 Satoshi Ishii
 Ikuhisa Minowa
 Alistair Overeem
 Mirko Cro Cop

Events

Event locations
Total event number: 24

These cities have hosted the following numbers of Dream events as of Dream 18:

 Japan (24)

 Saitama – 15
 Yokohama – 4
 Nagoya – 2
 Osaka – 2
 Tokyo - 1

References

External links

 
2008 establishments in Japan
Organizations established in 2008
Mixed martial arts organizations
Mixed martial arts events lists
2012 disestablishments in Japan
Organizations disestablished in 2012

ja:DREAM (格闘技イベント)